124 Houston Street is a historic building in Savannah, Georgia, United States. Built by Isaiah Davenport, it is located in the northwestern trust lot of Greene Square and was built between 1814 and 1816. It is part of the Savannah Historic District.

The property formerly extended to the north, right up to East State Street, but it has since been shortened by about one quarter. Its dormer windows have also been removed.

See also
Buildings in Savannah Historic District

References

Houses in Savannah, Georgia
Houses completed in 1816
Greene Square (Savannah) buildings
Savannah Historic District